The Solo Sessions, Vol. 2 is an album by jazz pianist Bill Evans, released in 1992.

Evans recorded The Solo Sessions, Vol. 1 and Vol. 2 at the same session, on January 10, 1963 and the tracks were originally released as part of Bill Evans: The Complete Riverside Recordings in 1984.

Track listing
"All the Things You Are" (Hammerstein II, Kern) – 9:10
"Santa Claus Is Coming to Town" (Coots, Gillespie) – 4:33
"I Loves You Porgy" (Gershwin, Gershwin, Heyward) – 5:50
"What Kind of Fool Am I?" [Take 2] (Bricusse, Newley) – 6:49
"Love Is Here to Stay" (Gershwin, Gershwin) – 4:01
"Ornithology" (Harris, Parker) – 5:33
"Medley: Autumn in New York/How About You?" (Duke, Freed, Lane) – 6:21

References

1989 albums
Bill Evans albums
Albums produced by Orrin Keepnews
Milestone Records albums
Solo piano jazz albums
Sequel albums